Marber is a surname. Notable people with the surname include:

 Andreas Marber (born 1961), German playwright and dramaturge
 Ian Marber (born 1963), nutrition therapist and author
 Patrick Marber (born 1964), English comedian, playwright, director, puppeteer, actor and screenwriter
 Romek Marber (born 1925), Polish freelance designer